In the Battlefields (maarek hob) is a 2004 Lebanese film by director Danielle Arbid. The film premiered on May 16 during the 2004 Cannes Film Festival, in the Directors' Fortnight section where the film ran for the Caméra d'Or during the 2004 Cannes Film Festival. It is the first feature film by Danielle Arbid.

Synopsis 

It's 1983, during the Lebanese civil war. Lina, a twelve-year-old girl, is a close friend with her eighteen-year-old aunt's maid Siham. She tries to defend her friend without getting any kind of attention from her or from her family.

Cast and characters 

 Marianne Feghali as Lina.
 Rawia El Chab as Siham.
 Laudi Arbid as Yvonne (the aunt).
 Aouni Kawass as Fouad (the Father).
 Carmen Leboss as Thérèse (the mother).

Production 

The director Danielle Arbid made a brief appearance in the movie as the neighbor's friend.

References

External links 
 
 Directors' Fortnight page on In the battlefields

2004 films
2000s war drama films
2000s Arabic-language films
Lebanese Civil War films
Lebanese drama films
2004 drama films
Films directed by Danielle Arbid